Central New Annan is a community in the Canadian province of Nova Scotia, located in  Colchester County .

References
Central New Annan on Destination Nova Scotia

Communities in Colchester County